Now Summer 2008 is a compilation album released by EMI Music Australia in 2007. It is the 19th album of the Australian Now! series.

Track listing

Disc 1
Matchbox Twenty – "How Far We've Come" (3:32)
Plain White T's – "Hey There Delilah" (3:52)
The Veronicas – "Hook Me Up" (2:55)
James Blunt – "1973" (4:40)
Missy Higgins – "Peachy" (2:39)
Silverchair – "If You Keep Losing Sleep" (3:20)
John Butler Trio – "Better Than" (3:28)
Operator Please – "Get What You Want" (3:53)
Scribe – "F.R.E.S.H." (3:25)
Che'Nelle – "I Fell in Love with the DJ" (3:28)
The Cat Empire – "So Many Nights" (3:32)
Joss Stone – "Tell Me What We're Gonna Do Now" (3:41)
Paolo Nutini – "New Shoes" (3:21)
KT Tunstall – "Hold On" (2:58)
Eskimo Joe – "London Bombs" (3:49)
Stereophonics – "It Means Nothing" (3:49)
Paramore – "Misery Business" (3:32)
Armand Van Helden – "I Want Your Soul" (3:12)
Eyerer & Chopstick feat. Zdar – "Make My Day (Haunting)" (3:05)
David Guetta featuring Chris Willis – "Love Is Gone" (3:22)
The Chemical Brothers – "The Salmon Dance" (3:04)
Shaggy featuring Rikrok and Tony Gold – "Bonafide Girl" (3:37)
Gummibär – "I'm a Gummy Bear (The Gummy Bear Song)" (3:11)

Disc 2
Sneaky Sound System – "Goodbye" (3:29)
Faker – "This Heart Attack" (3:48)
Ricki-Lee – "Love Is All Around" (3:24)
Kisschasy – "Spray on Pants" (3:48)
Hilary Duff – "Stranger" (3:22)
Nickelback – "Rockstar" (4:14)
Thirty Seconds to Mars – "A Beautiful Lie" (4:04)
Soft Tigers – "Mr. Ice Cream" (4:27)
Reverend and The Makers – "He Said He Loved Me" (2:54)
The Hampdens – "Generation Y" (3:56)
Josh Pyke – "Fed & Watered" (3:51)
Clare Bowditch and The Feeding Set – "When the Lights Went Down" (3:22)
Custom Kings – "Up Late" (2:37)
Angus & Julia Stone – "The Beast" (3:49)
José González – "Down the Line" (3:10)
The Waifs – "Stay" (2:27)
The Hot Lies – "Emergency! Emergency!" (3:04)
Airbourne – "Diamond in the Rough" (2:54)
Freaks – "The Creeps (Get on the Dancefloor)" (2:46)
Róisín Murphy – "Overpowered" (3:37)
Super Mal featuring Luciana – "Bigger Than Big" (2:54)
Peter Gelderblom – "Waiting 4" (3:28)
Paul van Dyk featuring Rea Garvey – "Let Go" (3:42)

References
NOW Summer 2008 @ Australian-Charts

2007 compilation albums
EMI Records compilation albums
Now That's What I Call Music! albums (Australian series)